Seesaw searchlights were an early electric powered searchlight first developed in the 1870s used in conjunction with coast artillery.

The searchlight consisted of an electric carbon lamp, capable of a strong beam for target illumination. Because the bulb was vulnerable to enemy fire, it was protected in a recessed emplacement whilst a large mirror, attached to the end of a 'see-saw' pivoting iron beam reflected the beam across the water to the target. The light was powered by steam engines usually housed in the nearby forts.

Only a few of these were built anywhere in the British Empire, and were difficult to operate and were never successful. New Zealand's example had been abandoned by 1899.

Surviving examples
No complete examples have survived but concrete emplacements can still be found at:
Fort Ballance, Wellington, New Zealand
Fort Victoria, Isle of Wight
Warden Point Battery on the Isle of Wight

See also
Military applications of searchlight
Canal Defence Light
Turbinlite
Leigh light
G-numbers
German searchlights of World War II

References

Coastal fortifications
Types of lamp